Delphyre is a genus of moths in the subfamily Arctiinae. The genus was erected by Francis Walker in 1854.

Species
Delphyre cumulosa Dyar, 1914
Delphyre elachia Dyar, 1914
Delphyre hebes Walker, 1854
Delphyre tetilla (Dognin, 1898)

Former species
Delphyre testacea (Druce, 1884)

References

External links

Euchromiina
Moth genera